Nassim Bounekdja (born October 23, 1976) is a former Algerian international football player. He has eight caps for the Algeria national team and played for the team at the 2002 African Cup of Nations.

International career
Bounekdja made his debut for the Algeria national team on July 31, 1998, in a 2000 African Cup of Nations qualifier against Libya. Bounekdja started the game with Algeria winning 2-0.

National team statistics

Honours

Club
 CR Belouizdad
Algerian Championnat National
Winner: 2000-01, 2000–02
Algerian League Cup
Winner: 2000

References

External links
DZFoot Profile

1976 births
2002 African Cup of Nations players
Algeria international footballers
Algerian footballers
CR Belouizdad players
Living people
People from El Biar
MC Oran players
MO Constantine players
MO Béjaïa players
OMR El Annasser players
JS El Biar players
Algeria under-23 international footballers
Competitors at the 1997 Mediterranean Games
Association football defenders
Mediterranean Games competitors for Algeria
21st-century Algerian people